The Buick Six was a top level automobile produced by GM's Buick Division which was first introduced in 1914, and was the senior vehicle to the Buick Series B Four. It was an all new platform which was shared with the Oldsmobile Six and was the first Buick to implement a steering wheel on the left side, and electric starter provided by Delco Remy along with an electric lighting system. The gearshift and emergency brake were relocated to a central position inside the vehicle, an approach used on all GM products for 1914. It continued to use the patented overhead valve engine implemented by Walter Lorenzo Marr while the cylinder head was not removable until later developments. The first year Buick Six was only offered as a touring sedan for US$1,985 ($ in  dollars ).

The various body styles were supplied by Fisher Body of Detroit, MI. In 1925, it was updated with both the Buick Master Six and the Buick Standard Six when the four-cylinder engine platform was cancelled. During this time period, Oldsmobile introduced the Light Eight, sourced and shared from the Cadillac Type 51 while Buick chose to stay with the smooth running six-cylinder engine, while Cadillac didn't offer a six-cylinder engine till several decades later. Buick was the only GM product to use the exclusive overhead valve engine however. Chevrolet didn't become a division until 1918. The list of available body styles was extensive, listing 14 different choices. The top level choice for 1925 was the 7 passenger Town Car for US$2,925 ($ in  dollars ).

See also
Cadillac Type 51
Oldsmobile Six
Oakland Six
Chevrolet Series FA
"From a Buick 6," a song by Bob Dylan that references the car in the title

References

 Slauson, H. W.; Howard Greene (1926). "Leading American Motor Cars”. Everyman’s Guide to Motor Efficiency. New York: Leslie-Judge Company.

Six
Veteran vehicles
1900s cars